The Hotel Elysée is a New York City hotel on 60 East 54th Street between Madison and Park Avenues in Midtown Manhattan. The hotel was founded in 1926 as a European-style hotel for the carriage trade by Swiss-born Max Haering.

History
Hotel Elysée was founded in 1926 as a European-style hotel for the carriage trade by Swiss-born Max Haering. New York's leading hatcheck concessionaire, Mayer Quain, purchased the hotel out of bankruptcy in 1937. After the War, his children eclectically designed every room so that no two rooms were alike. In lieu of traditional numbers, the rooms were named to reflect their personality, such as the "Sayonara" suite assigned to Marlon Brando after his starring role in Teahouse of the August Moon. Tennessee Williams lived in the hotel for fifteen years and died in the "Sunset" suite.

Columnist Jimmy Breslin, who regards the Elysée as "a great hotel, a genuine New York landmark," succeeded Ruark as the hotel's unofficial chronicler. Upon Tennessee Williams's death at the Elysée in February 1983, Breslin recalled the story of a transient guest who called the front desk at 5:00 am complaining that someone in the next suite was keeping her awake by typing all night. "They knew right away who the culprit was, but they couldn't very well ask Mr. Williams to stop playwriting, so we simply moved the guest to another room."

In November 1948, Tallulah Bankhead celebrated President Harry S. Truman's victory over Thomas E. Dewey in the 1948 United States presidential election by throwing a noisy party at the hotel that ran non-stop for five days and nights.

The Monkey Bar
The Elysée is known for the Monkey Bar, a piano bar just off the lobby. Opened in the 1940s, it became known to the cognoscenti as "the place to go where jokes die," especially off-color jokes and double-entendre songs spun by such performers as Johnny Payne (1934-1964), Marion Page (1950-1965) and Mel Martin (1945-1983). Johnny Andrews played the piano at cocktail hour for over 50 years (1936-1990).

Starting out as just another dimly lit hotel piano bar with mirrored paneling, the tiny room was expanded in the early 1950s when the mirrors were replaced by wraparound hand-painted mural by caricaturist Charlie Vella. Eight more monkeys were added to the bar mural in 1984 by artist Diana Voyentzie "to remind customers of their behaviour." In 1995, when the bar was redesigned by the architect David Rockwell, all of the monkeys were unified by Voyentzie with more monkeys and palm trees and foliage.

References

External links
  of the Hotel Elysée

Hotels in Manhattan
Midtown Manhattan